Phtheochroa chalcantha is a species of moth of the family Tortricidae. It is found in the Near East and Russia.

The wingspan is 17–19 mm. The forewings are white, tinged with yellow. There is a suffused orange streak along the costa. The hindwings are light grey.

References

Moths described in 1912
Phtheochroa